Horseshoe Bend, Shirehampton is an 11 acre (4.45 hectare) biological Site of Special Scientific Interest in Bristol, England, on the north bank of a lower, tidal stretch of the River Avon, 1.9 miles  (3 kilometres) downstream from the Avon Gorge, and just east of the village of Shirehampton. It was notified as an SSSI in 1999.

Description 

The site consists of a wooded cliff and a narrow salt marsh. The underlying rocks are Devonian sandstone and Carboniferous limestone, overlaid with Triassic dolomitic conglomerate.

Biological interest

Wooded cliff

The site's principal interest and the reason for its designation as an SSSI is the presence of a population of the True Service-tree (Sorbus domestica) growing on the cliffs. This tree is nationally rare in Britain, and this site hosts the largest known population in England. Other notable species of Sorbus here are the whitebeams Sorbus eminens and Sorbus anglica, both of which are also nationally rare in Britain. The nationally scarce Large-leaved Lime (Tilia platyphyllos) also occurs, and herbs include Field Garlic (Allium oleraceum) and Pale St. John's-wort (Hypericum montanum).

Saltmarsh plants

The saltmarsh vegetation, which lies at the base of the cliff, is predominantly made up of Sea Aster (Aster tripolium) and English Scurvygrass (Cochlearia anglica). There are however two nationally scarce vascular plant species here as well – Slender Hare's-ear (Bupleurum tenuissimum) and Long-stalked Orache (Atriplex longipes).

Wreck of the Kron Prinz 
On 1 April 1874, the German grain ship  was under tow up the Avon, laden with 7,000 quarters (28,000 imperial bushels, 1,000 m3) of grain. There was an adequate depth of water, as it was approaching high tide, but on the narrow channel through Horseshoe Bend she grounded on the outer bank. As the tide soon began to ebb, the ship settled onto the steep mud bank and then fell over. The cargo was lost and to avoid blocking the navigation channel, the ship was demasted. Nearly three weeks later, on 20 April, she was refloated and taken to Bristol for repairs, at a cost of £34,000.

The grounded ship was photographed and there is a well-known photograph of her on her side, taken from across the Avon. This was later published as a postcard by local photographer Fred Little, although it was not (as sometimes claimed) his photograph, as he had been born in the same year.

References

 English Nature citation sheet for the site  (accessed 13 July 2006)

External links
 English Nature  (SSSI information)
 English Nature

Sites of Special Scientific Interest in Avon
Sites of Special Scientific Interest notified in 1999
Woodland Sites of Special Scientific Interest
Protected areas of Bristol
River Avon, Bristol